The second season of the Case Closed anime was directed by Kenji Kodama and produced by TMS Entertainment and Yomiuri Telecasting Corporation. The series is based on Gosho Aoyama's Case Closed manga series. In Japan, the series is titled  but was changed due to legal issues with the title Detective Conan. The episodes' plot continues Jimmy Kudo's life as a young child named Conan Edogawa. The episodes features a temporary return of Jimmy Kudo.

The season initially ran from August 19, 1996 through April 14, 1997 on Nippon Television Network System in Japan. Episodes twenty-nine to fifty-four were later collected into seven DVD compilations by Shogakukan and were released on February 24, 2006. The season licensed and dubbed by Funimation Entertainment. Case Closed was aired on Cartoon Network's Adult Swim programming block and on Canada's YTV station. Case Closed aired until August 16, 2004, where it was dropped by Adult Swim due to low ratings. The English adaption was later collected and released on four DVD compilations. The English adaption of season two was later released in a DVD boxset by Funimation on September 30, 2008 containing episodes twenty-seven to fifty-two, twenty-six to fifty-one in the Japanese numbering. The season two DVD boxset Viridian edition is slated for release on September 15, 2009.

The episodes use nine pieces of theme music: three opening themes and two closing themes in the Japanese episodes and one opening theme and ending theme in the English ones. The second opening theme is "Feel Your Heart" by Velvet Garden until episode fifty-two. The remaining episodes use the ending theme  by Keiko Utoko. The English opening theme is "Mune ga Doki Doki" with English lyrics and renamed "First New Century" by Carl Finch until episode fifty-four. It is followed by "Nazo" with English lyrics by Stephanie Nadolny for the rest of the episodes. The English ending theme is "Step by Step" with English lyrics by Carl Finch to episode fifty-two. It is later followed by "Hikari to Kage no Roman" with English lyrics also by Stephanie Nadolny.



Episode listing

Notes

 The episode's numbering as followed in Japan
 The episode's numbering as followed by Funimation Entertainment
 The episodes were aired as a single hour long episode in Japan
 These episodes are part of the third season of Case Closed

References
General

Specific

1996 Japanese television seasons
1997 Japanese television seasons
Season 2